The Canoe Marathon European Championships is an international canoe marathon event organised by the European Canoe Association. The first edition took place in 1995 and subsequent stagings were held every two years until 2013, after which it became an annual competition.

Host venues
Thirteen editions have been organised in nine different countries since the first championships in 1995. As of 2013, the competition has been staged every year.

1995: Murcia, Spain
1997: Pavia, Italy
1999: Gorzów, Poland
2001: Győr, Hungary
2003: Gdańsk, Poland
2005: Týn nad Vltavou, Czech Republic
2007: Trenčín, Slovakia
2009: Ostróda, Poland
2011: Saint-Jean-de-Losne, France
2013: Vila Verde, Portugal
2014: Piešťany, Slovakia
2015: Bohinj, Slovenia
2016: Pontevedra, Spain
2017: Ponte de Lima, Portugal
2018: Metković, Croatia
2019: Decize, France
2021: Moscow, Russia
2022: Silkeborg, Denmark

Medal table

References

External links
 European Canoe Association

 
Canoeing and kayaking competitions in Europe
Canoe marathon